Best Kept Secret is the third studio album by singer Jennifer Paige. It was released on April 25, 2008 in Germany and selected European countries. The first single was "Wasted", the second single was "Underestimated" and the third single was "The Calling". The album was re-released as a deluxe edition on November 20, 2009 featuring a few new songs, including the new single, "Beautiful Lie" with Nick Carter.

Track listing
 "Feel the Love" – 03:36 (Paige, Moring)
 "Best Kept Secret" – 03:03 (Paige, Robinson, Björklund)
 "The Calling" – 04:12 (Paige, Landon)
 "Here in the Sun" – 04:33 (Paige, Beiden)
 "Sugarcoated" – 03:30 (Paige, Beiden)
 "Broken Things" – 03:57 (Miller)
 "Underestimated" – 03:48 (Paige, Ries)
 "Bloom" – 03:52 (Paige, Beiden)
 "I Do" – 03:33 (Paige, Booker)
 "Downpour" – 04:23 (Paige, Jay, Pedersen)
 "Wasted" – 03:38 (Hawkes, Thoresen)
 "Be Free" – 03:33 (Paige, von Schlieffen, Moring)
 "Mercy" – 04:09 (Paige, Stenzel, Kadish)

2009 Re-release
 "Beautiful Lie" (with Nick Carter) – 3:22 (Falk, Paige, Carter) 
 "Feel the Love" – 03:36 (Paige, Moring)
 "Best Kept Secret" – 03:03 (Paige, Robinson, Björklund)
 "The Calling" – 04:12 (Paige, Landon)
 "Here in the Sun" – 04:33 (Paige, Beiden)
 "Sugarcoated" – 03:30 (Paige, Beiden)
 "Broken Things" – 03:57 (Miller)
 "Underestimated" – 03:48 (Paige, Ries)
 "Bloom" – 03:52 (Paige, Beiden)
 "I Do" – 03:33 (Paige, Booker)
 "Downpour" – 04:23 (Paige, Jay, Pedersen)
 "Wasted"  – 03:38 (Hawkes, Thoresen)
 "Be Free" – 03:33 (Paige, von Schlieffen, Moring)
 "Crush" 2009 Remix by DJ Kore – 03:26 (Mueller, Goldmark, Clark, Cosgrove)
 "Mercy" – 04:09 (Paige, Stenzel, Kadish)

Jennifer Paige albums
2008 albums